The Bayerische Oberlandbahn GmbH (BOB) is a private railway company based in Holzkirchen, Germany, and owned by Transdev Germany (formerly known as Veolia Verkehr). Since June 2020 its services are operated under the brand Bayerische Regiobahn (BRB) of its sister company.

BOB Trains connect Munich with the alpine hamlets of Bayrischzell, Lenggries, and the spa town of Tegernsee. The routes are not electrified and are serviced with diesel-hydraulic and diesel-mechanic DMUs.

Lines served

The three BOB lines run on part of what was the Bayerischen Maximiliansbahn as a combined train-set from München Hauptbahnhof via the southern ring to Holzkirchen. In Holzkirchen the combined train-set separates with one train-set heading off to the east, running through Miesbach and Schliersee to Bayrischzell.

The two remaining train-sets continue on to Schaftlach where they separate again, with one train-set going to Lenggries via Bad Tölz, while the last train-set heads off towards the southeast to Tegernsee. The Tegernsee Line makes use of the tracks owned by the Tegernsee-Bahn, a private rail infrastructure provider.

The separate train-sets travel from München Hauptbahnhof to Holzkirchen or Schaftlach as a single train. They then split-up and travel on to their individual destinations. On the return trip to Munich the individual units are connected again and run as a single train back to München Hauptbahnhof. Between Holzkirchen and Munich BOB Trains run under the Münchner Verkehrs- und Tarifverbund tariff system.

The Bayerische Oberland Bahn GmbH is a member of the "Tarifverband der Bundeseigenen und Nichtbundeseigenen Eisenbahnen in Deutschland" (TBNE: Tariff Association of federally and non-federally owned railways in Germany).

History
BOB was founded on 31 March 1998 and began service the same year. The company was launched to create more competition on the rail systems of southern Bavaria.

In the early days of service BOB trains were often plagued by technical problems with the new/untested Integral train set. These initial problems have since been resolved and BOB is now considered very reliable.

Since the beginning of July 2004 BOB has added three Bombardier Talent Train-sets to cover rush hour service.

BOB also operates on some DB electric lines using FLIRT3 electric multiple units from Stadler Rail. Between December 2013 and June 2020 these services were operated under the Meridian brand name.

Accidents and incidents
On 9 February 2016, two Stadler FLIRTs were involved in a head-on collision near Bad Aibling. Several people were killed and approximately 100 were injured.

Timetable
BOB Lines are serviced at hourly/bi-hourly intervals, and with extra trains during rush hour. However, since December 2004 every other train/direction has had an increased journey time of 12 to 14 minutes. This contradicts the basic idea of a single Integrated Timetable.

Utilization
BOB Trains are not only highly used during weekdays, but also on the weekend by tourist and locals planning excursions to the Bavarian Alps, with walking, bike riding and skiing being favorite activities. Either a Bayern Ticket from Deutsche Bahn or a BOB weekend pass may be purchased for up to five passengers at a significantly discounted fare. Bus connections are available in Lenggries and Tegernsee to Karwendel, Achensee, Rofan and the Ski slopes on Wendelstein (not to be confused with the town Wendelstein), Brauneck, Spitzing.

Gallery

References

External links
 

Railway companies of Germany
Private railway companies of Germany
Rail transport in Bavaria